Mitch All Together is stand-up comedian Mitch Hedberg's second comedy album.  It is a recording of a performance at the Acme Comedy Club in Minneapolis, Minnesota, from May 2003. The CD was packaged with a DVD of Hedberg's 1999 Comedy Central special in two versions, the first being the one edited down to a half-hour and shown on Comedy Central, and the second being the raw unedited taping which is about 15 minutes longer. The DVD also features his appearance on a 1998 episode of Comedy Central's Premium Blend. The CD is packaged in a double-fold digipack.

As with his previous album, the title Mitch All Together is a reference to a joke which is not included on the album (the joke is on track seven of the 1999 self-released edition of his previous album Strategic Grill Locations):

Track listing
"This CD Is In Stores"  – 3:40
"Sandwiches"  – 2:18
"Not Track Five, Not Chainsaw Juggler"  – 1:06
"Teeth"  – 1:53
"Candy Bars"  – 2:04
"Houses"  – 2:20
"Pop"  – 2:35
"The Pipe"  – 2:04
"Business Cards"  – 2:23
"Sesame Seeds"  – 1:34
"Three Easy Payments"  – 2:05
"Arrows"  – 2:25
"Saved by the Buoyancy of Citrus"  – 2:16
"Mitch in the S'th"  – 2:39
"Bed and Breakfast"  – 4:18
"X"  – 1:37
"Movie Pot"  – 1:43

Charts

Certifications

References

Mitch Hedberg albums
2003 live albums
2003 video albums
Live video albums
Comedy Central Records live albums
Stand-up comedy albums
Spoken word albums by American artists
Live spoken word albums
Comedy Central Records video albums
2000s comedy albums